Pseudomonas brassicacearum is a Gram-negative soil bacterium that infects the roots of Brassica napus, from which it derives its name. Based on 16S rRNA analysis, P. brassicacearum falls within the P. fluorescens group. It has also been shown to have both pathogenic and plant growth-promoting effects on tomato plants.

References

External links
Type strain of Pseudomonas brassicacearum at BacDive -  the Bacterial Diversity Metadatabase

Pseudomonadales
Bacteria described in 2000